Michael A. Daly is an American record producer, songwriter, and multi-instrumentalist. Daly attended the Berklee College of Music in Boston, graduating in 1994.  Daly first came to prominence as the Whiskeytown resident multi-instrumentalist and co-writer. He wrote or co-wrote many of the songs on the Pneumonia album and has contributed to all of Caitlin Cary's solo releases.

Daly has gone on to have a successful career as a studio musician, songwriter, and producer.  He's worked with many artists in a range of different genres including Jason Mraz, Lana Del Rey, Imagine Dragons, Young the Giant, Grace Potter and the Nocturnals, The Plain White T's, and Jimmy Barnes.

Daly has spoken as a panelist at the South by Southwest Festival and has appeared on numerous television programs including The Tonight Show with Jay Leno, Good Morning America, and Regis and kelly. He's also performed live at Austin City Limits.

In 2008, Daly wrote his first book, entitled Time Flies When You're in a Coma: The Wisdom Of The Metal Gods, a book which the publisher describes as a collection of "Zen Questions, Daily Affirmations, Meditations, and Words of Wisdom" based on Heavy metal songs. It was released on October 28, 2008.

Daly is currently Executive Director of A&R and Music Publishing at Disney Music Group (Hollywood Records, Buena Vista Records, and Disney Music Publishing).

He is also serving as a mentor for the 2017 Techstars Music Accelerator Program.

Selected discography

References

External links
 

Year of birth missing (living people)
Living people
American alternative country singers
American country singer-songwriters
Record producers from New Jersey
Berklee College of Music alumni
People from Roselle Park, New Jersey
Singer-songwriters from New Jersey
Whiskeytown members